Iota Leonis, Latinized from ι Leonis, is a triple star system in the constellation Leo. The system is fairly close to the Sun, at only 79 light-years (24.2 parsecs) away, based on its parallax. The system has a combined apparent magnitude of 4.00 making it faintly visible to the naked eye. It is moving closer to the Sun with a radial velocity of −10 km/s.

Iota Leonis has a spectral type of F3 IV, matching that of an F-type subgiant star. It is a spectroscopic binary, which means it is a binary star with components that are too close together to be able to resolve individually through a telescope. In this case, light from only the primary star can be detected, and it is considered single-lined.

The third component in the star system is designated Iota Leonis B. It orbits the central pair almost every 200 years, and with its perihelion passage in 1948, the separation between the two is steadily growing. Iota Leonis B has a mass approximately 8% greater than that of the Sun. It is a G-type main-sequence star, like the Sun.

Name

See also
 Traditional Chinese star names#Leo

References
 

F-type subgiants
Triple star systems
Spectroscopic binaries
Suspected variables
Leonis, Iota
Leo (constellation)
Durchmusterung objects
Leonis, 78
055642
99028
4399